A utility meter is any of the following metering devices used on utility mains:

 Electricity meter, a device for measuring electricity usage
 Smart meter, an electrical meter that records consumption of electric energy and communicates information to the utility for monitoring and billing
 Gas meter, a specialized flow meter used to measure the volume of fuel gases such as natural gas and propane
 Water meter, a device for measuring water usage
 Heat meter, instruments intended for measuring the heat which, in a heat-exchange circuit, is given up by a liquid called the heat-conveying liquid.

See also
 Prepayment meter (disambiguation)